Antônio Géder Malta Camilo (born 23 April 1978 in Recreio, Minas Gerais), known as Géder, is a Brazilian former professional footballer who played as a defender.

Géder joined Russian side Saturn Moscow Oblast in 2003 after spending five seasons with Vasco da Gama. He joined Spartak Moscow in August 2006, and in January 2008 he moved to French Ligue 1 club Le Mans. After two seasons, exactly on the 23 July 2010, he rescinded his contract with the club by mutual consent and joined Sport Recife in Brazil.

He was originally a right-back in Brazil but converted to centre-back when he arrived in Russia.

References

External links
 Profile at the Brazilian Football Confederation database
 Spartak Profile
 

1978 births
Living people
Sportspeople from Minas Gerais
Association football defenders
Brazilian footballers
CR Vasco da Gama players
FC Saturn Ramenskoye players
FC Spartak Moscow players
Le Mans FC players
Sport Club do Recife players
Russian Premier League players
Ligue 1 players
Brazilian expatriate footballers
Expatriate footballers in France
Expatriate footballers in Russia